Vemuri Anjaneya Sarma (24 October 1917 – 6 May 2003) was an Indian writer in the Telugu and Hindi languages. He was active in literary and cultural fields in the Indian independence movement.

Literary contributions

Books written on Literary Integration 

 'Tootthi Paramparayen' Translation of Telugu novel by Mahidhar Rammohan Rao into Hindi.
 "House Surgeon" translation of Telugu novel written by Dr. Kommuri Venugopala Rao which was awarded with National prize for best translation
 "Is Desh Ki Yah Bhi Ek Samasya Hai" translation of novel by Dr. K. Venugopal Rao into Hindi
 "Dilli Dalarulu" translation of Hindi novel by Panday Bechan Sarma "Ugra" into Telugu
 "Kalasina Jeevithalu", translation of Malela Jeev in Telugu, Gujarati novel by Pannalal Patel
 "Jeevitham Oka Nataka Rangam" translation of Gujarathi Novel into Telugu by Sri Pannalal Patel
 "Vishwarathudu" - Gujarathi Novel - K.M. Munshi into Telugu
 'Sambarakanya' - Gujarathi Novel — K.M. Munshi
 'Devadatta' - Gujarathi Novel — K.M. Munshi into Telugu
 'Vishwanath Ki Kahaniyan' - Telugu Stories of Jnanapeeth Puraskar Winner Sri Viswanatha Satyanarayana into Hindi
 'Munimanikyam Ki Kahaniyan' - Telugu Stories by Sri Munimanikyam Narasimha Rao into Hindi
 'Akkasha Deepam' - Hindi Stories into Telugu
 'Urdu Kathalu' - Urdu Stories into Telugu
 'Alluri Seetharama Raju' - Drama of Sri Padala Rama Rao into Hindi
 'Kala-Jeevitha Darshanam' - Kaka Kalekar's Book into Telugu
 Naa Bhartha Naa Daivam' - Book on Sri Lalbahadur Sastry as Told by Smt. Lalitha Devi written by Umashankarji
 'Tirupathi Venkata Kavulu' English to Telugu Translation
 Translation of 'Gandhi and Marx' by Kishorilal Mashruwala  into Telugu
 'Godavari Hans Padi' - Telugu Stories into Hindi — Editing
 'Kali Khil Uthi' - Telugu Short Stories — Editing
 'Srestha Kahaniyan' - Collection of Hindi Stories - 1973
 'Bharath Katha Sarovar' - Stories written in Hindi by Non Hindi writers — Editing
 'Vishwanath Krititva Aur Vyaktitwa' - Articles written — Editing
 'Mangal prabhatham' - Gandhi's book into Telugu
 Founder Editor of 'Sravanthi' Telugu Literary Monthly

Editor 
 Founder Editor of 'Sravanthi' - Telugu Literary Monthly being Published for 52 years By DBHP Sabha, Hyderabad
 Poorna Kumbh_Hindi Monthly
 Dakshin Bharath — Hindi Monthly
 Dakshin Bharathi — Hindi Quarterly
 Kerala Bharathi — Hindi Monthly
 Samaveth Swar — Hindi Bi – Monthly

References 

 Author: Suryudi Yedo Gurram , Logili.com
 Book: Who's Who of Indian Writers, 1999, by Karthik Chandra Dutt Page: 49 
 Author: Citsukhas Contribution to Advaita, 1974
 Kavi Samrat Viswanatha Satyanarayana abhinandana sanchika, 1971-72

1917 births
2003 deaths
20th-century Indian linguists
People from Prakasam district
Writers from Karnataka